Anna Elsa Gunilla Ekström, née Jonsson (born 23 June 1959), is a Swedish Social Democrat politician who served as Minister for Education from January 2019 to October 2022. She previously served as the Minister for Upper Secondary School, Adult Education and Training from 2016 to 2019 and as director-general of the National Agency for Education from 2011 to 2016.

In 2015, she, along with Göran Hägglund, participated in the SVT show På spåret; they placed second overall.

She is the daughter of former Prosecutor-General of Sweden (1989–1994) Torsten Jonsson and his wife Birgitta Jonsson (born Gyllenhammar), a cousin of Swedish businessman Pehr G. Gyllenhammar. Her brother is former Liberal Party state secretary Håkan Jonsson.

References

External links 

Living people
1959 births
Women government ministers of Sweden
Swedish Ministers for Education